Pogonillus is a genus of longhorn beetles of the subfamily Lamiinae, containing the following species:

 Pogonillus inermis Bates, 1885
Pogonillus panamensis Heffern, Nascimento & Santos-Silva, 2018
 Pogonillus subfasciatus Bates, 1885

References

Desmiphorini